Wellow could be one of these places in England:

Wellow, Hampshire
Wellow, Isle of Wight
Wellow, Nottinghamshire
Wellow, Somerset